Bee Fork is a stream in Oregon County of the U.S. state of Missouri. It is a tributary of Mill Creek.

Bee Fork was so named because honeybees were observed near its course.

See also
List of rivers of Missouri

References

Rivers of Oregon County, Missouri
Rivers of Missouri